Nothing Valley is the debut studio album by American band Melkbelly. It was released on October 13, 2017 through Wax Nine Records, a subsidiary of Carpark Records.

Accolades

Track listing

References

2017 debut albums
Carpark Records albums